Methylorubrum pseudosasae  is a Gram-negative, aerobic, facultatively methylotrophic bacteria from the genus Methylorubrum which has been isolated from bamboo leaves.

References 

Hyphomicrobiales
Bacteria described in 2016